Eucalyptus volcanica is a species of tree that is endemic to northern New South Wales. It has rough, fibrous to flaky bark on the trunk, smooth bark above, lance-shaped or curved adult leaves, flower buds in groups of seven, white or creamy white flowers and cup-shaped or barrel-shaped fruit.

Description
It has varying amounts of rough, fibrous to flaky grey bark on the trunk, smooth grey to green bark above.

Taxonomy and naming
Eucalyptus volcanica was first formally described in 1990 by Lawrie Johnson and Ken Hill from specimens collected by Hill near Mount Lindesay in 1986. The specific epithet (volcanica) refers to the volcanic substrates, including trachyte on which this species grows.

Distribution and habitat
This tree grows on shallow soils, usually over trachyte, on elevated parts of the Nandewar and Warrumbungle Ranges.

References

volcanica
Myrtales of Australia
Flora of New South Wales
Trees of Australia
Plants described in 1990